William Thom may refer to:

William Thom, Scottish poet
William Thom (preacher), co-founder of the Methodist 'New Itinerancy'
William R. Thom, U.S. Representative from Ohio
Bill Thom, baseball player

See also 
 William Thoms, a British writer credited with coining the term "folklore" in 1846